The Airwave Sport is an Austrian single-place, paraglider that was designed by Bruce Goldsmith and produced by Airwave Gliders of Fulpmes. It is now out of production.

Design and development
The Sport was designed as an intermediate glider. The five models are each named for their relative size.

Operational history
Reviewer Noel Bertrand described the Sport in a 2003 review as "a lively DHV 1-2 wing".

Variants
Sport XS
Extra small-sized model for lighter pilots. The glider model is DHV 1-2 certified.
Sport S
Small-sized model for lighter pilots. The glider model is DHV 1-2 certified.
Sport M
Mid-sized model for medium-weight pilots. The glider model is DHV 1-2 certified.
Sport L
Large-sized model for heavier pilots. The glider model is DHV 1-2 certified.
Sport XL
Extra large-sized model for heavier pilots. The glider model is DHV 1-2 certified.

Specifications (Sport L)

References

Sport
Paragliders